New York City Subway shooting may refer to:
 1984 New York City Subway shooting, a mass shooting that injured 4 people
 2022 New York City Subway attack, another mass shooting and a terrorist attack that injured 29 people, 10 of them by gunfire and 19 by other causes

See also 
 Crime in New York City
 List of mass shootings in the United States